The 1969–70 Kansas Jayhawks men's basketball team represented the University of Kansas during the 1969–70 college men's basketball season.

Roster
Dave Robisch
Pierre Russell
Bud Stallworth
Bob Kivisto
Roger Brown
Aubrey Nash
Chester Lawrence
Fred Bosilevac Jr.
Neal Mask
Mark Mathews
Tim Natsus

Schedule

References

Kansas Jayhawks men's basketball seasons
Kansas Jayhawks
Kansas
Kansas